The EGF module-containing Mucin-like hormone Receptors (EMRs) are closely related subgroup of G protein-coupled receptors (GPCRs). These receptors have a unique hybrid structure in which an extracellular epidermal growth factor (EGF)-like domain is fused to a GPCR domain through a mucin-like stalk.  There are four variants of EMR labeled 1-4, each encoded by a separate gene. These receptors are predominantly expressed in cells of the immune system and bind ligands such as CD55.

References

External links
 
 
 
 

G protein-coupled receptors